Cannock Chase District Council elections are held three years out of every four, with a third of the council elected each time. Cannock Chase District Council is the local authority for the non-metropolitan district of Cannock Chase in Staffordshire, England. Since the last boundary changes in 2002, 41 councillors have been elected from 15 wards.

Political control
The first elections were held in 1973, initially operating as a shadow authority before coming into its powers on 1 April 1974. Political control of the council since 1974 has been held by the following parties:

Leadership
The leaders of the council since 2005 have been:

Council elections
1973 Cannock Chase District Council election
1976 Cannock Chase District Council election (New ward boundaries)
1978 Cannock Chase District Council election
1979 Cannock Chase District Council election
1980 Cannock Chase District Council election
1982 Cannock Chase District Council election
1983 Cannock Chase District Council election
1984 Cannock Chase District Council election
1986 Cannock Chase District Council election
1987 Cannock Chase District Council election
1988 Cannock Chase District Council election
1990 Cannock Chase District Council election
1991 Cannock Chase District Council election
1992 Cannock Chase District Council election
1994 Cannock Chase District Council election
1995 Cannock Chase District Council election
1996 Cannock Chase District Council election
1998 Cannock Chase District Council election
1999 Cannock Chase District Council election
2000 Cannock Chase District Council election
2002 Cannock Chase District Council election (New ward boundaries reduced the number of seats by 1)
2003 Cannock Chase District Council election
2004 Cannock Chase District Council election
2006 Cannock Chase District Council election
2007 Cannock Chase District Council election
2008 Cannock Chase District Council election
2010 Cannock Chase District Council election
2011 Cannock Chase District Council election
2012 Cannock Chase District Council election
2014 Cannock Chase District Council election
2015 Cannock Chase District Council election
2016 Cannock Chase District Council election
2018 Cannock Chase District Council election
2019 Cannock Chase District Council election
2021 Cannock Chase District Council election

District result maps

By-election results

2004

2007

2009

2017

References

By-election results

External links
Cannock Chase District Council

 
Cannock Chase District
Council elections in Staffordshire
District council elections in England